Andronymus helles, the lesser ochreous dart, is a butterfly in the family Hesperiidae. It is found in Sierra Leone, Liberia, Ivory Coast, Ghana, Nigeria, Cameroon, Gabon, the Republic of the Congo, the Central African Republic, Angola, the Democratic Republic of the Congo and Uganda. The habitat consists of forests.

References

Butterflies described in 1937
Erionotini